Alonso Martínez is a station on Line 4, Line 5 and Line 10 of the Madrid Metro. It is located in Zone A.

The station was named after the Spanish jurist and politician Manuel Alonso Martínez.

References 

Line 4 (Madrid Metro) stations
Line 5 (Madrid Metro) stations
Line 10 (Madrid Metro) stations
Railway stations in Spain opened in 1944